Three ships of the Royal Navy have borne the name HMS Chanticleer, possibly after the character Chanticleer in Geoffrey Chaucer's  The Nun's Priest's Tale:

 was a 10-gun  brig-sloop launched in 1808. She was used as a survey ship from 1828, and was scheduled to make the second South America survey of 1831, but because she was in such poor condition  was selected instead. Chanticleer was used as a Customs Watch vessel from 1845. She was renamed WV5 in 1863 and was broken up in 1871.
 was a  wooden screw sloop launched in 1861 and sold in 1878.
 was a modified Black Swan-class sloop launched in 1942.

References

Royal Navy ship names